The 2014 Virgin Australia All-Australian team represents the best performed Australian Football League (AFL) players during the 2014 season. It was announced on 16 September as a complete Australian rules football team of 22 players. The team is honorary and does not play any games.

Selection panel
The selection panel for the 2014 All-Australian team consisted of chairman Gillon McLachlan, Kevin Bartlett, Luke Darcy, Mark Evans, Danny Frawley, Glen Jakovich, Cameron Ling, Matthew Richardson and Warren Tredrea.

Team

Initial squad

Final team

Note: the position of coach in the All-Australian team is traditionally awarded to the coach of the premiership team.

 midfielder Matt Priddis won that year's Brownlow Medal, but didn't make the final All-Australian team. It was the first time this had happened since  midfielder Shane Woewodin missed selection in 2000.

References

All-Australian Team